"Zombie Bastards" is a song by the American rock band Weezer, released as a single from their "Black Album" on November 21, 2018.

Composition
Lyrically, "Zombie Bastards" addresses Weezer fans who are "stuck in the past," and criticizing them whenever they change their sound. The song contains ska-influenced guitars, a dub bass, sampling and keyboards, which was described by Tom Breihan from Stereogum as "Weezer doing stadium-goth Spotify-core." The song has been described as pop rock and electropop.

Reception

Randall Colburn at The A.V. Club gave "Zombie Bastards" a positive response, stating "...while as chintzy and overproduced as so much latter-day Weezer, has a cheeky, soaring chorus that should have even the dourest Pinkerton stans shouting along." Emma Swann at DIY was more critical of the song, stating "‘Zombie Bastards’ is so childlike it'd be easy to question if it were intended for an infant audience if it wasn't for the, well, bastards."

References

2018 singles
2018 songs
Electropop songs
Songs written by Rivers Cuomo
Weezer songs